Glenelg, Mars (or Glenelg Intrigue) is a location on Mars near the Mars Science Laboratory (Curiosity rover) landing site (Bradbury Landing) in Gale Crater marked by a natural intersection of three kinds of terrain.

Name
The location was named Glenelg by NASA scientists for two reasons: all features in the immediate vicinity were given names associated with Yellowknife in northern Canada, and Glenelg is the name of a geological feature there. Furthermore, the name is a palindrome, and as the Curiosity rover is planned to visit the location twice (once coming, and once going) this was an appealing feature for the name. The original Glenelg is a village in Scotland which on 20 October 2012 had a ceremony, including a live link to NASA, to celebrate their "twinning" with Glenelg on Mars.

One of the three types of terrain intersecting at Glenelg is layered bedrock, which is attractive as the first drilling target.

Images

See also
Aeolis Mons
Aeolis Palus
Aeolis quadrangle
Bedrock
Composition of Mars
Geology of Mars
List of rocks on Mars
Rock outcrop
Timeline of Mars Science Laboratory
Water on Mars

References

External links 
Video (04:32) - Evidence: Water "Vigorously" Flowed On Mars - September, 2012

Geography of Mars
Aeolis quadrangle
Mars Science Laboratory
Gale (crater)